Chris von Martels (born 13 October 1982) is a Canadian equestrian athlete. He won team silver and individual bronze at the 2015 Pan-American Games in Toronto. Von Martels represented Canada at the 2020 Olympic Games in Tokyo, finishing 39th in the individual competition.

Personal life
Von Martels was born to a Canadian mother and a Dutch father. He is married to Lisa Kostandoff. Together they run their own equestrian business in sales and training of dressage horses in Ridgetown, Ontario and Wellington, Florida. During the summer he spend his time in the Netherlands for his equestrian business.

References

1982 births
Living people
Canadian male equestrians
Canadian dressage riders
Pan American Games medalists in equestrian
Pan American Games silver medalists for Canada
Pan American Games bronze medalists for Canada
Equestrians at the 2015 Pan American Games
Equestrians at the 2020 Summer Olympics
Olympic equestrians of Canada
Medalists at the 2015 Pan American Games
20th-century Canadian people
21st-century Canadian people